Lans or LANS may refer to:

Places
 Lans, Tyrol, a municipality in Tyrol, Austria
 Lake Lans, a lake near Lans, Tyrol

France
 Lans, Saône-et-Loire
 Lans-en-Vercors, a community near Grenoble in the Vercors
 Villard-de-Lans, a community and ski station in the French Alps (1968 Winter Olympics)
 Mont-de-Lans, a town and commune until 2017 (now Les Deux Alpes, Isère)

People
 Christiaan Lans (1789-1843), governor of the Dutch Gold Coast
 Håkan Lans (born 1947), Swedish inventor
 Lans Bovenberg (Arij Lans Bovenberg, born 1958), Dutch economist
 Van der Lans, Dutch surname

Other uses
 Los Alamos National Security, the company that runs Los Alamos National Laboratory
 LAN (disambiguation)